Hunychi is a Ukrainian village in the Korosten Raion (district) of Zhytomyr Oblast (province).

References 

Villages in Korosten Raion